Štěnovický Borek is a municipality and village in Plzeň-City District in the Plzeň Region of the Czech Republic. It has about 600 inhabitants.

Administrative parts
The village of Nebílovský Borek is an administrative part of Štěnovický Borek.

References

Villages in Plzeň-City District